The Kontxako Bandera (Basque) or Bandera de la Concha (in Spanish, meaning "Flag of the Kontxa") is one of the oldest and most famous estropada race along the Bay of Biscay, held annually in the Kontxa, the main bay of San Sebastián, Spain. It takes place on the first two weekends in September and regularly draws crowds of more than 100,000 people and around 20 rowing teams. It was first held in 1879 and has been held most years since with the main exception of the war years. 

In Galician it's called Bandeira da Cuncha and Drapeau de La Concha in French.

Background

Estropadak is a very popular form of rowing competition common all along the coast of the Northern coast of the Iberian Peninsula.

A crew is made up of thirteen oarsmen and the cox, who faces them at the stern. The boats are called traineru (trainera in Spanish, trainière in French) and are derived from 19th century fishing boats.

This is the most important competition in the Bay of Biscay and takes place the first two Sundays in September, within the framework of the Basque Week, with the best teams from all along the Northern coast competing against each other.

The teams must row three nautical miles to a buoy, turn around and return to the starting line. So instead of the normal four lengths, teams only do two lengths in this race.

The final always consists of two races between the eight finalists. To qualify, all teams bar one must take part in a race against the clock on the first weekend, the seven best of which go forward to the finals the following weekend. The eighth team is always from the host town and does not have to qualify. In the finals, the eight teams race in two groups of four across the same distance again.

For example, in the 2007 race there were 21 teams taking part:

Of these, the top seven went into the final which Orio won with a time of 19:16.68.

Statistics
The most successful teams in the Kontxako Bandera are Orio (32 flags), Pasai San Pedro (15 flags), San Sebastián (14 flags), Hondarribia (14 flags) and Pasai Donibane (10 flags).
The fastest times were achieved by Castro Urdiales (18:59.94 in 2006) and El Astillero (19:05.02 in 2006 and 19:09.10 in 2005)

Winning teams
Listed here after their town with the name of the team given in brackets:

1879-1900

1879 San Sebastián
1880 Pasai San Pedro
1881 Hondarribia
1882 -
1883 San Sebastián
1884 -
1885 - 
1886 - 
1887 San Sebastián
1888 - 
1889 San Sebastián
1890 San Sebastián
1891 San Sebastián
1892 San Sebastián
1893 - 
1894 San Sebastián
1895 Getaria
1896 Getaria
1897 San Sebastián
1898 Ondarroa
1899 Pasai San Pedro
1900 Getaria

1901-1950

1901 Orio
1902 -
1903 Getaria
1904 - 
1905 - 
1906 Pasai San Pedro
1907 -
1908 -
1909 Orio
1910 Orio
1911 Getaria
1912 -
1913 -  
1914 - 
1915 San Sebastián
1916 Orio
1917 Pasai San Pedro
1918 San Sebastián
1919 Orio
1920 San Sebastián
1921 Pasaia (La Unión)
1922 San Sebastián
1923 Orio
1924 Pasai Donibane 
1925 Orio
1926 Ondarroa
1927 Pasai San Pedro
1928 Pasai San Pedro
1929 Pasai San Pedro
1930 Pasai San Pedro
1931 Pasai San Pedro            
1932 Pasai San Pedro
1933 Orio
1934 Orio
1935 Pasai San Pedro
1936 -  
1937 -
1938 -
1939 Orio
1940 Orio
1941 Hondarribia
1942 Orio
1943 Hondarribia
1944 Orio
1945 Pedreña
1946 Pedreña
1947 Hondarribia
1948 Hondarribia
1949 Pedreña
1950 San Sebastián

1951-2000
1951 Orio
1952 Orio
1953 Orio
1954 Sestao (Iberia)
1955 Orio
1956 Pasai Donibane 
1957 Aginaga
1958 Orio
1959 Sestao (Iberia)
1960 Aginaga
1961 Pasai Donibane
1962 Pasai Donibane
1963 Pasai Donibane
1964 Orio
1965 Hondarribia
1966 Hondarribia
1967 Hondarribia
1968 Hondarribia
1969 Lasarte
1970 Orio
1971 Orio
1972 Orio
1973 Lasarte
1974 Orio
1975 Orio
1976 Pedreña
1977 Santurtzi
1978 Sestao (Kaiku)
1979 Santurtzi
1980 Sestao (Kaiku)
1981 Sestao (Kaiku)
1982 Sestao (Kaiku)
1983 Orio
1984 Zumaia
1985 Santurtzi
1986 Pasai Donibane
1987 Zumaia
1988 Pasai Donibane
1989 Pasai San Pedro
1990 Pasai Donibane(Koxtape)
1991 Pasai San Pedro              
1992 Orio
1993 Pasai San Pedro
1994 Pasai San Pedro
1995 Pasai Donibane(Donibaneko)
1996 Orio
1997 Orio
1998 Orio
1999 Pasai Donibane(Koxtape)
2000 Orio

2001-date
2001 Castro Urdiales            
2002 Castro Urdiales
2003 El Astillero (El Astillero)
2004 El Astillero (El Astillero)
2005 Hondarribia
2006 Castro Urdiales
2007 Orio (Orio Arraun Elkartea)
2008 Castro Urdiales
2009 Sestao (Kaiku)
2010 Bermeo (Urdaibai)
2011 Bermeo (Urdaibai)
2012 Sestao (Kaiku)
2013 Hondarribia
2014 Bermeo (Urdaibai)
2015 Bermeo (Urdaibai)
2016 Bermeo (Urdaibai)
2017 Orio (Orio Arraun Elkartea)
2018 Hondarribia
2019 Hondarribia
2020 Hondarribia

References

Kontxako Bandera (Town council's web, in Basque and Spanish)
Liga de Traineras (in Basque, Spanish and Galician)

External links
Estropadak (in Basque)

Sport in Gipuzkoa
Recurring sporting events established in 1879
Bay of Biscay
Rowing competitions in Spain
Sailing competitions in Spain
1879 establishments in Spain